Next Nuvve ( You're next) is a 2017 Indian Telugu-language horror comedy film directed by Prabhakar Podakandla. It stars Aadi, Vaibhavi, Brahmaji, and Rashmi Gautam. The film is about four protagonists trying to uncover the mystery behind a haunted palace. The film was a remake of the Tamil film Yaamirukka Bayamey which itself was based on the Korean film The Quiet Family.

Plot 
Kiran, a TV serial director loses a lot of money after his serial is shelved and is in deep debts. He, along with his girlfriend Smita want to convert his ancestral palace in Araku Valley into a resort and make money to clear their debts. He takes the help of Sarath and his sister Rashmi in converting the palace into a resort.
 
The guests coming to their resort mysteriously die. They dig graves and cover them up. A labourer complains to the police that he observed that they have been digging in the ground several times. He finds this suspicious and thinks that they are searching for some treasure underground. When Kiran is questioned by the police, he tells them that his guests are mysteriously died. The police check the register and find the names. However, the police tells him that all these people had already died years before.
 
Kiran comes to the palace and informs others that the guests had already died years before. Meanwhile, they encounter an old man (L. B. Sriram) who tells them that this palace is haunted by a devil (Himaja) and it will kill whoever buys the palace, indicating that Kiran will be next. At the end while the devil is about to kill Kiran, a goon (Jayaprakash Reddy) along with his gang enters. He forcefully takes the property from Kiran, although Kiran tries to convince him.
 
While Kiran and others come out of the palace guests started going inside. The story ends with the goon and his squad joining the guests line, implying that the ghost killed them.

Cast 

 Aadi as Kiran
 Vaibhavi as Smita
 Brahmaji as Sarath
 Rashmi Gautam as Rashmi
 Himaja as Ghost
 L. B. Sriram as Ghost Lover
 Ramjagan
 Srinivas Avasarala as Younger Ghost Lover
 Jaya Prakash Reddy
 Benarjee as Inspector
 Satya Krishnan as School Teacher
 Duvvasi Mohan
 Pruthvi Raj
 Raghu Babu as RGV
 Posani Krishna Murali
 Thagubothu Ramesh as Gunta Babji
 Mumaith Khan
 Rajitha
 Sri Charan
 Getup Srinu
 Raghava
 Anurag
 Subhash
Ramjagan

Soundtrack

The soundtrack was composed by Sai Karthik, with lyrics written by Krishna Kanth.

References

External links 
 

Indian comedy horror films
Telugu remakes of Tamil films
Indian remakes of South Korean films
2010s Telugu-language films
Films scored by Sai Karthik